Gordon Food Service (GFS) is a foodservice distributor based in Wyoming, Michigan serving the Midwest, Northeast, Southeast, and Southwest regions of the United States and coast-to-coast in Canada. It also operates stores in Florida, Illinois, Indiana, Kentucky, Michigan, Missouri, New York, Ohio, Pennsylvania, Tennessee, Alabama, and Wisconsin.

According to Forbes Magazine, GFS is the twenty-second largest privately held company in the United States. Its biggest competitors are US Foods and Sysco.

History
In 1897, Isaac Van Westenbrugge, a 23-year-old Dutch immigrant, started a butter-and-egg delivery service using a horse-drawn cart and $300 borrowed from his brother. In 1916, Ben Gordon joined the company and later married Van Westenbrugge's daughter, Ruth. In 1942, Ben and his brother Frank renamed the company Gordon Food Service. Since then, Gordon Food Service has grown to become the largest privately held and family-managed foodservice distributor in North America. Gordon Food Service serves a wide variety of foodservice companies across industries, ranging from restaurants, to healthcare, education, and more.

Wholesale distribution

GFS has distribution centers located in Springfield, Ohio, Shepherdsville, Kentucky, Wyoming, Michigan, Brighton, Michigan, Douglasville, Georgia, Aberdeen, Maryland, Miami, Florida, Plant City, Florida, Houston, Texas, Dallas, Texas, Imperial, Pennsylvania, Kenosha, Wisconsin, Taunton, Massachusetts and Kannapolis, North Carolina.

Gordon Food Service has 14 distribution centers in the U.S., located in Aberdeen, Maryland; Brighton, Michigan; Concord, North Carolina; Coppell, Texas; Houston, Texas; Imperial, Pennsylvania; Kenosha, Wisconsin; Lithia Springs, Georgia; Miami, Florida; Plant City, Florida; Shepherdsville, Kentucky; Springfield, Ohio; Taunton, Massachusetts; and Wyoming, Michigan.

In 1996, the company began a series of acquisitions in Canada, forming Gordon Food Service Canada. It now has 7 distribution centers in Canada, located in Amherst, Nova Scotia; 
Boucherville, Quebec; Delta, British Columbia; Edmonton, Alberta, Milton, Ontario; Quebec City, Quebec; Rocky View County, Alberta; and Winnipeg, Manitoba.

They deliver products via truck to more than 100,000 customers, including independent restaurants, long-term care facilities, hospitals, schools, colleges, and regional and national chain restaurants.

Stores
Gordon Food Service opened its first cash and carry store in 1979. They were renamed GFS Marketplace in 1992 and rebranded to Gordon Food Service Store in 2014. As of 2019, they operate more than 175 stores across Florida, Illinois, Indiana, Kentucky, Michigan, Missouri, New York, Ohio, Pennsylvania, Tennessee, and Wisconsin. The company began renovating many stores in 2019.

References

Companies based in Grand Rapids, Michigan
Companies based in Kent County, Michigan
Privately held companies of the United States
Catering and food service companies of the United States
Food and drink companies established in 1897
1897 establishments in Michigan